Mansour Bahrami and Fabrice Santoro were the defending champions, and successfully defended their title, defeating John McEnroe and Cédric Pioline in the final, 6–1, 2–6, [12–10].

Draw

Final

Group C
Standings are determined by: 1. number of wins; 2. number of matches; 3. in three-players-ties, percentage of sets won, or of games won; 4. steering-committee decision.

Group D
Standings are determined by: 1. number of wins; 2. number of matches; 3. in three-players-ties, percentage of sets won, or of games won; 4. steering-committee decision.

References

Legends Over 45 Doubles